The Caudron R.11 (or R.XI in contemporary usage), was a French three-seat twin-engine long range escort fighter biplane developed and produced by Caudron during the First World War.

Development
The R.XI was intended to fulfill a French Corps d'Armee requirement for a long range three-seat escort fighter. Its design was similar to the Caudron R.4, but without a nose-wheel, and with longer wings and fuselage, with two bracing bays outboard the engines rather than three, along with a much larger tail. Hispano-Suiza 8Ba liquid-cooled V-8 engines were housed in streamlined nacelles just above the lower wing, fitted with frontal radiators, which replaced the air-cooled Renault engines used in the R.4.

Operational history
Production of the 1000 R.XIs ordered by the French Army began in 1917, with the first aircraft completed late in that year.

The first escadrille, R 46, was equipped with the type in February 1918 and the last escadrille to form  was R 246, before the Armistice resulted in an abrupt end to production, at which point approximately 370 aircraft had been completed by Caudron, Régy Frères and Gremont.

Variants
Caudron R.XI C.3  Heavy escort fighter with   Hispano-Suiza 8Bda engines.

Caudron R.XII C.3 R.XI with the more powerful  Hispano-Suiza 8Fb engines that were expected to boost performance. It first flew in November 1918 but was still undergoing testing in mid-1919 and no production followed despite plans to equip 12 escadrilles.

A single example was built following the conversion of an R.XI to carry the cannon in August 1918.

Operators

French Air Force
Escadrille R 46
Escadrille R 239
Escadrille R 240
Escadrille R 241
Escadrille R 242
Escadrille R 246

Royal Air Force received two examples for evaluation as a bomber.

American Expeditionary Force received two examples for evaluation, and two others were detached to US units.

Specifications (Caudron R.XI C.3)

References

Notes

Bibliography

Military aircraft of World War I
R011
Biplanes
1910s French fighter aircraft
Aircraft first flown in 1916